is a mini-album released by the Japanese rock band The Back Horn on September 21st, 1999.  This was the band's first indie release.

Track list

Pink Soda (Pinku Sōda, ピンクソーダ) - 3:45
Crow (Karasu, カラス) - 4:54
Winter's Milk (Fuyu no Miruku, 冬のミルク) - 4:48
Torpedo (Gyōrai, 魚雷) - 4:22
Praying for Rain (Amagoi, 雨乞い) - 0:56
Myserious Cloud (Ayashiki Kumoyuki, 怪しき雲ゆき) - 4:29
Autumn (Banshū, 晩秋) - 4:41
Wherever I go (Doko e Yuku, 何処へ行く) - 5:03

References

The Back Horn albums
1999 EPs